Francisco I. Madero is a city and seat of the Pánuco de Coronado, in the state of Durango, north-western Mexico.  As of 2010, the town of Francisco I. Madero had a population of 4,550.

Education 
The city of Francisco I. Madero is served by 9 public school campuses which provide education to students in grades K–12.

Elementary and junior high schools 
The city of Francisco I. Madero have three schools for students grades K–8. They are: Benito Juarez The School, Miguel Hildalgo North Division School,

High schools 
The public high school in Madero are: Technical Middle School No. 2.

Colleges and universities 
Madero is served on the collegiate level by Benito Juarez The College, and College Bacheillers classes are held in morning and evening hours.

References

Populated places in Durango